Plagiolophus is an extinct genus of herbivore. The genus Plagiolophus is documented, almost solely in Western Europe, from the middle Eocene up to the mid Oligocene. The genus displays a wide range in size and weight (between 10 and 150 kg).

References

Odd-toed ungulates
Prehistoric mammal genera